Marhemetabad-e Jonubi Rural District is in the Central District of Miandoab County, West Azerbaijan province, Iran. At the National Census of 2006, its population was 11,704 in 2,720 households. There were 12,246 inhabitants in 3,365 households at the following census of 2011. At the most recent census of 2016, the population of the rural district was 12,410 in 3,726 households. The largest of its 20 villages was Chelik, with 1,765 people.

References 

Miandoab County

Rural Districts of West Azerbaijan Province

Populated places in West Azerbaijan Province

Populated places in Miandoab County